Museo Abel Santamaría Cuadrado is a museum located in the old Saturnino Lora Hospital, Santiago de Cuba. It was established on July 26, 1973. It holds pictures and documents about 1953 events, the Moncada Barracks assault and the October 16th Fidel Castro trial. It is named after Abel Santamaría Cuadrado.

See also 
 List of museums in Cuba

References 

Museums in Cuba
Buildings and structures in Santiago de Cuba
Museums established in 1973
1973 establishments in Cuba
20th-century architecture in Cuba